Román Arturo Martínez Canales (born 18 August 2002), also known as Mozumbito, is a Mexican professional footballer who plays as a forward for Liga MX club América.

Career statistics

Club

References

External links
 
 
 

2002 births
Living people
Mexican footballers
Mexico youth international footballers
Association football forwards
Club América footballers
Liga MX players
People from Puebla (city)